Electro Physiological Feedback Xrroid (EPFX), also known as Quantum Xrroid Consciousness Interface (QXCI), is a radionics device which claims to read the body's reactivity to various frequencies and then send back other frequencies to make changes in the body. It is manufactured and marketed by self-styled "Professor Bill Nelson," also known as Desiré Dubounet. She is currently operating in Hungary, a fugitive from the US following indictment on fraud charges connected to EPFX.

Descriptions of the device in mainstream media note its US$20,000 price tag and the improbable nature of the claims made for it. It has reportedly been used to "treat" a variety of serious diseases including cancer. In one documented case, undiagnosed and untreated leukaemia resulted in the death of a patient.

The website Quackwatch posted an analysis of the device by Stephen Barrett which concludes: "The Quantum Xrroid device is claimed to balance 'bio-energetic' forces that the scientific community does not recognize as real. It mainly reflects skin resistance (how easily low-voltage electric currents from the device pass through the skin), which is not related to the body's health."

In 2009, imports to the US were banned.

See also
 List of ineffective cancer treatments
 Pseudoscience

References

External links 
  An investigative report on fraudulent or dangerous alternative medical devices, focusing on the EPFX.

Health fraud
Alternative cancer treatments